Nino Flavio Rojas Sagal (born 4 April 1987) is a Chilean former footballer who played as a striker for clubs in Chile and Costa Rica.

Career
A product of Rangers de Talca youth system, Rojas had an extensive career in his homeland. He made appearances in the Chilean top division for Rangers, Curicó Unido and Unión La Calera. He also played for well-known clubs such as Deportes Temuco, Deportes Concepción, Cobreloa, Santiago Morning, among others.

In 2017, he had a stint with Alajuelense in the Costa Rican top division, where he came recommended by the former Chile international footballer Iván Zamorano since the coach was Benito Floro who had coached Zamorano in Real Madrid.

His last club was Independiente de Cauquenes.

Personal life
Rojas is nicknamed El Portaviones del Maule (The Aircraft Carrier from Maule) due to his strong build.

Rojas is the cousin of the Chile international footballer Ángelo Sagal and his younger brother Bastián, and the son of Bernardino "Loco Nino" Rojas, a well-known footballer in his city of birth, Talca.

References

External links
 
 

1987 births
Living people
People from Talca
Chilean footballers
Chilean expatriate footballers
Chilean Primera División players
Primera B de Chile players
Rangers de Talca footballers
Lota Schwager footballers
Curicó Unido footballers
Unión La Calera footballers
Deportes Concepción (Chile) footballers
Cobreloa footballers
San Marcos de Arica footballers
Santiago Morning footballers
Tercera División de Chile players
Deportes Linares footballers
Deportes Colchagua footballers
Deportes Temuco footballers
Deportes Iberia footballers
Segunda División Profesional de Chile players
Deportes Copiapó footballers
Puerto Montt footballers
Independiente de Cauquenes footballers
Liga FPD players
L.D. Alajuelense footballers
Chilean expatriate sportspeople in Costa Rica
Expatriate footballers in Costa Rica
Association football forwards